This is a summary of the electoral history of Tony Blair, who served as Prime Minister of the United Kingdom from 1997 to 2007 and Leader of the Labour Party from 1994 to 2007. He was the Member of Parliament (MP) for Sedgefield from 1983 to 2007.

Parliamentary elections

1982 by-election, Beaconsfield

1983 general election, Sedgefield

1987 general election, Sedgefield

1992 general election, Sedgefield

1997 general election, Sedgefield

2001 general election, Sedgefield

2005 general election, Sedgefield

1994 Labour Party leadership election

United Kingdom general elections

1997 general election

2001 general election

2005 general election

References

Tony Blair
Blair, Tony
Blair, Tony